Pickelville was a small town located near the western shore of Bear Lake,  northeast of Salt Lake City, in Rich County, Utah, United States. It is now part of Garden City.

Incorporated in 1935, the town was named for Charles C. Pickel, who is said to have been either an engineer who supervised the town's culinary water project, or a federal government official who helped secure funding for the project from the Public Works Administration. To further expand the water system, Pickelville merged with Garden City in 1979.

Since 1916, the Pickelville area has been home to the Ideal Beach Amusement Company. The Pickleville Playhouse, a community musical theater, has been in business since 1977, performing a melodrama and a Broadway-style show every summer.

Climate
This climatic region is typified by large seasonal temperature differences, with warm to hot (and often humid) summers and cold (sometimes severely cold) winters.  According to the Köppen Climate Classification system, Pickelville has a humid continental climate, abbreviated "Dfb" on climate maps.

References

External links 
Pickleville Playhouse Website
Ideal Beach Resort Website

Former towns in Utah
Populated places established in 1879
Former populated places in Rich County, Utah
Populated places disestablished in 1979
Garden City, Utah